Cormorant Township is a township in Becker County, Minnesota, United States. The population was 1,039 as of the 2010 census.

Geography

Lakes
 Bergerson Lake
 Big Cormorant Lake (Minnesota) (west three-quarters)
 Cuba Lake
 Dahlberg Lake (southwest quarter)
 Fig Lake
 Larson Lake
 Leaf Lake (west quarter)
 Lake Ida
 Long Lake
 Middle Cormorant Lake
 Mollar Lake
 Nelson Lake
 Rose Lake
 Rossman Lake
 Severson Lake
 Tub Lake
 Turtle Lake
 Upper Cormorant Lake

Adjacent townships
 Lake Park Township (north)
 Audubon Township (northeast)
 Lake Eunice Township (east)
 Dunn Township, Otter Tail County (southeast)
 Scambler Township, Otter Tail County (south)
 Tansem Township, Clay County (southwest)
 Parke Township, Clay County (west)
 Eglon Township, Clay County (northwest)

Cemeteries
The township contains Cormorant Lutheran Cemetery.

Demographics
As of the census of 2000, there were 965 people, 422 households, and 316 families residing in the township. The racial makeup of the township was 98.86% White, 0.21% African American, 0.10% Native American, 0.31% Asian, and 0.52% from two or more races. Hispanic or Latino of any race were 0.41% of the population.

There were 422 households, out of which 20.1% had children under the age of 18 living with them, 69.2% were married couples living together, 2.6% had a female householder with no husband present, and 25.1% were non-families. 20.9% of all households were made up of individuals, and 8.1% had someone living alone who was 65 years of age or older.  The average household size was 2.29 and the average family size was 2.63.

In the township the population was spread out, with 17.3% under the age of 18, 3.8% from 18 to 24, 22.2% from 25 to 44, 34.3% from 45 to 64, and 22.4% who were 65 years of age or older.  The median age was 49 years. For every 100 females, there were 106.2 males.  For every 100 females age 18 and over, there were 106.7 males.

The median income for a household in the township was $47,560, and the median income for a family was $54,444. Males had a median income of $41,635 versus $28,125 for females. The per capita income for the township was $24,016.  About 1.6% of families and 4.7% of the population were below the poverty line, including 5.8% of those under age 18 and 1.8% of those age 65 or over.

Media attention
In 2014, a Great Pyrenees dog named Duke won the annual election for the ceremonial mayorship of Cormorant. Twelve votes were cast. He won his fourth consecutive term in May 2017. Duke died in 2019.

CBOYSTV, a popular YouTube channel, is headquartered near Cormorant. The channel sometimes uses the township for meet and greets.

Notes

References

Bibliography
 United States National Atlas
 United States Census Bureau 2007 TIGER/Line Shapefiles
 United States Board on Geographic Names (GNIS)

External links

Townships in Becker County, Minnesota
Townships in Minnesota